Maputo Protection Area is a marine protected area in Mozambique. It  was established when the government of Mozambique proclaimed the area on the 14 July 2009 and declared the   Marine Protected Area stretching from Ponta do Ouro in the south to the Maputo River Mouth in Maputo Bay in the north (including the Inhaca and Portuguese islands)  as a Marine Protected Area, the area stretches three nautical miles into sea.

References

See also
List of conservation areas of Mozambique

Protected areas of Mozambique